John Cockbill (born 16 April 1940) is an Australian rower. He competed in the men's coxed pair event at the 1956 Summer Olympics.

References

External links
 

1940 births
Living people
Australian male rowers
Olympic rowers of Australia
Rowers at the 1956 Summer Olympics
Place of birth missing (living people)